The e-puck is a small (7 cm) differential wheeled mobile robot. It was originally designed for micro-engineering education by Michael Bonani and Francesco Mondada at the ASL laboratory of Prof. Roland Siegwart at EPFL (Lausanne, Switzerland). 
The e-puck is open hardware and its onboard software is open-source, and is built and sold by several companies.

Technical details 
 Diameter: 70 mm
 Height: 50 mm
 Weight: 200 g
 Max speed: 13 cm/s
 Autonomy: 2 hours moving
 dsPIC 30 CPU @ 30 MHz (15 MIPS)
 8 KB RAM
 144 KB Flash
 2 step motors
 8 infrared proximity and light (TCRT1000)
 color camera, 640x480
 8 LEDs in ring + one body LED + one front LED
 3D accelerometers
 3 microphones
 1 loudspeaker

Extensions 

New modules can be stacked on top of the e-puck; the following extensions are available:
 a turret that simulates 1D omnidirectional vision, to study optic flow,
 ground sensors, for instance to follow a line,
 color LED turret, for color-based communication,
 Zigbee communication,
 2D omnidirectional vision,
 magnetic wheels, for vertical climbing,
 Pi-puck extension board, for interfacing with a Raspberry Pi single-board computer.

Scientific use 
Since the e-puck is open hardware, its price is lower than competitors. This is leading to a rapid adoption by the scientific community in research despite the original educational orientation of the robot.
The e-puck has been used in collective robotics  , evolutionary robotics , and art-oriented robotics  .

References

External links
 Homepage - the e-puck project homepage
 e-puck at Mobots - the e-puck homepage at Mobots, the group who developed the e-puck
 e-puck at gna - the gna page of e-puck onboard software
 e-puck model - Documentation of the e-puck model in the Webots robotics simulator. 
 Cyberbotics' robot curriculum - a robotics curriculum based on the e-puck robot

Micro robots
Robots of Switzerland
Differential wheeled robots
Open-source robots
Multi-robot systems